The Foton Grand General G9, or Foton Dajiangjun G9 in Chinese, is a mid-size pickup truck made by Foton in 2021, and shown at the 2020 Beijing Auto Show originally as the Foton Grand General.

Overview

The Foton Grand General G9 is based on the same platform as the Foton Tunland Yutu pickup series while featuring a different front end. The powertrain of the Grand General G9 has three options, all turbocharged: a 2.0-liter gasoline, 2.0-liter diesel, or a 2.5-liter diesel engine, and an 8-speed automatic gearbox is standard on the gasoline models. The lineup started at 129,800 yuan at the time of introduction.

Design Controversies
The design of the Grand General G9 is controversial as the front fascia heavily resembles that of the Ford F-150 Raptor.

See also
Ford F150
Ford F-150 Raptor

References

Pickup trucks
Cars of China
Cars introduced in 2020